Sungai Besar is a federal constituency in Sabak Bernam District, Selangor, Malaysia, that has been represented in the Dewan Rakyat since 2004.

The federal constituency was created in the 2003 redistribution and is mandated to return a single member to the Dewan Rakyat under the first past the post voting system.

Demographics

History

Polling districts
According to the federal gazette issued on 31 October 2022, the Sungai Besar constituency is divided into 30 polling districts.

Representation history

State constituency

Current state assembly members

Local governments

Election results

References

Selangor federal constituencies